St. Joseph was a boomtown that briefly became the largest community in Florida, United States, before being abandoned less than eight years after it was founded. St. Joseph was founded in 1835 on the shores of St. Joseph Bay. A brief period of prosperity was ended by a yellow fever epidemic in 1841, and the abandoned remnants of the town were destroyed by a storm surge in 1844. The town site is in Gulf County, Florida, near the city of Port St. Joe.

Background
The creation of St. Joseph grew out of a land dispute in Apalachicola, Florida. Early in the 19th century John Forbes and Company, a Scottish-owned trading company authorized by the Spanish government of Florida to trade with Indians, had pressured Creeks and Seminoles to settle their debts with the company by transferring title to large tracts of land in Florida. The transfers were confirmed as grants by the Spanish government. The partners of John Forbes and Company sold most of the Forbes Purchase to what later became the Apalachicola Land Company before the transfer of Florida from Spain to the United States in 1821.

Establishment of the legitimacy of Spanish land grants in Florida made in the final years before the transfer of Florida required validation in United States courts. By the time that ownership of the Forbes Purchase by the Apalachicola Land Company had been confirmed in court in 1835, the town of Apalachicola had grown up on the west side of the mouth of the Apalachicola River. The land company offered to sell title to the occupied lots in town, but at prices that drove many residents to abandon their homes and move west to the shores of St. Joseph Bay.

Growth and prosperity

St. Joseph Bay is a good natural harbor, while large ships had to anchor  from Apalachicola, with cargo being transferred by barge between ships and the shore. On the other hand, St. Joseph Bay has no inflowing streams or rivers, and in 1835, had essentially nothing to ship out. The settlers of St. Joseph intended to divert cargo moving down the Apalachicola River, principally cotton and lumber, to the bay, bypassing Apalachicola. The Lake Wimico and St. Joseph Canal Company was chartered by the Legislative Council of the Territory of Florida in 1835 to dig a canal between St. Joseph and Lake Wimico, which was connected to the Apalachicola River by the Jackson River. Before excavation of the canal began, the company decided to connect Lake Wimico and St. Joseph with a railroad, and work was started on the roadbed. In 1836, the legislative council amended the company's charter (which become the Lake Wimico and St. Joseph Canal and Railroad Company) to allow it to build a railroad from any point on the Apalachicola River to St. Joseph.

By 1837 St. Joseph had become the most populous place in Florida, with an reported population between 4,000 and 12,000 inhabitants. (The 1840 federal census counted 125 heads of household and approximately 750 free whites in St. Joseph.) In 1838 the town hosted the first Constitutional Convention for Florida, which drew up a proposed constitution to be used when Florida became a state.

St. Joseph was originally in Franklin County. Calhoun County was created out of Franklin, Jackson and Washington counties in 1838, with St. Joseph serving as the county seat until the collapse of the city.

St. Joseph had a mixed reputation. It was regarded as a "healthy and pleasant town", and many residents of Tallahassee resorted there in the summer. A delegate to the constitutional convention in 1838 wrote: "It was a striving busy place, its citizens full of energy and hope, fine buildings and hotels adorned the town and more were building." The same writer extolled the beauty of the bay. On the other hand, the presence of a gambling house, a horse racing track, bars, and the many sailors expected in a busy port, resulted in St. Joseph being called the "wickedest City in the Southeast."

In 1839 the St. Joseph Bay Light was built and placed in operation on St. Joseph Point, the northern end of the St. Joseph Peninsula, to mark the entrance to St. Joseph Bay. The light remained in service until 1847, when the lighthouse lantern and other equipment were moved to the new Cape San Blas lighthouse. The old St. Joseph Bay lighthouse was washed away in 1851.

Decline and abandonment
Storms in 1837 and 1839 drove ships ashore and destroyed buildings. In 1841 a ship brought yellow fever to St. Joseph. The disease killed many of the town's inhabitants, and caused most of the rest to flee. Robert R. Reid, fourth governor of the Territory of Florida, and other residents of Tallahassee, died that year of yellow fever that they reportedly contracted while in St. Joseph. Of an estimated 5,000 inhabitants in early 1841, only some 500 remained in St. Joseph after the epidemic ended. A hurricane, "The Late Gale at St. Joseph", hit the town on September 14, 1841, destroying the wharf, but with the collapse of trade, no ships were in port. A forest fire later that year burned part of the town. In 1843 residents of Apalachicola moved many abandoned houses to Apalachicola. While many houses were dismantled for transportation to Apalachicola, some were placed on barges and floated intact to that city, where a few still exist.

On May 1, 1844, the  called at St. Joseph, and found a town largely deserted, with only a few residents preparing to leave, and some workers dismantling houses. Later that year a hurricane struck St. Joseph on September 9 with a large storm surge, destroying whatever remained in the abandoned town. Some who had regarded St. Joseph as a "sin city" interpreted the storm surge as a manifestation of God's wrath.

The area remained sparsely inhabited for the rest of the 19th century.

Present day 
The only remains of St. Joseph are some tombstones in the Old St. Joseph, or 'Yellow Fever', Cemetery in present-day Port St. Joe – coincidentally located very close to the current office of the county health department.

The Constitution Convention Museum State Park nearby explains the role of St. Joseph in the early history of Florida government.

See also 
 Lake Wimico and St. Joseph Canal and Railroad
 St. Joseph Point Light
 Saint Joseph, namesake

Footnotes

Citations

References

Further reading 
 Louise Porter. Lives of St. Joseph. St Joseph Historical Society (Dec 2001)

External links
 St. Joseph, Florida Ghost Town – retrieved February 17, 2006
 Lighthouse Friends - St. Joseph Point, FL – retrieved February 17, 2006
 Old St. Joseph Cemetery a/k/a Yellow Fever Cemetery – retrieved February 17, 2006

Former populated places in Gulf County, Florida
Populated places established in 1835
Ports of the Gulf of Mexico
Former populated places in Florida
Former county seats in Florida
Former municipalities in Florida
1835 establishments in Florida Territory